This is a list of diplomatic missions in Vietnam (not including honorary consulates). Currently, Vietnam hosts 80 embassies

Diplomatic missions in Hanoi

Embassies

Other missions or delegations 
 (Economic & Cultural Office)

Gallery

Consular missions

Da Nang 

 (Consulate-General)
 (Consulate-General)
 (Consulate-General)
 (Consulate-General)
 (Consulate-General)

Gallery

Ho Chi Minh City 

 (Consulate-General)
 (Consulate-General)
 (Consulate-General)
 (Consulate-General)
 (Consulate-General)
 (Consulate-General)
 (Consulate-General)
 (Consulate-General)
 (Consulate-General)
 (Consulate-General)
 (Consulate-General)
 (Consulate-General)
 (Consulate-General)
 (Consulate-General)
 (Consulate-General)
 (Consulate-General)
 (Consulate-General)
 (Consulate-General)
 (Consulate-General)
 (Economic & Cultural Office)
 (Consulate-General)
 (Consulate-General)
 (Consulate-General) 
 (Consulate-General)
 (Consulate-General)
 (Consulate-General)
 (Consulate-General)

Gallery

Non-resident embassies accredited to Vietnam 

Resident in Beijing, China

 

  

 
 

 
 
 

 

Resident in Kuala Lumpur, Malaysia

Resident in other cites

 (New Delhi)
 (New Delhi)
 (Tokyo)
 (New York City)
 (Seoul) 
 (Seoul)
 (Singapore)
 (Bangkok)
 (Bangkok)
 (Tokyo)
 (Jakarta)
 (Jakarta)

Missions to open 
 (Embassy)

Closed missions

See also
 Foreign relations of Vietnam
 List of diplomatic missions of Vietnam

Notes

References 

 
Diplomatic missions
Vietnam